James Sofronas (born September 9, 1968) is an American racing driver and the founder of Global Motorsports Group.

Motorsports career
Sofronas began his racing career in the early 1990s, purchasing a Nissan NX 2000 which was eligible for the SCCA SSB category. In order to make enough money to race it, Sofronas worked as a salesman at Pitney Bowes, using the street-legal car on sales calls despite the fact it had no air conditioning unit. In 1994, he acquired an SCCA Pro Racing license and took part in the SCCA Pro Racing World Challenge, driving an Oldsmobile Calais in the Super Production class. In his lone outing that season at Road America, Sofronas finished 9th in class. 

Sofronas began racing under the GMG Racing banner in the early 2000s; the team is used to advertise his auto tuning service he operates out of Southern California. He scored his first victory in the then-Speed World Challenge in 2008 at New Jersey Motorsports Park, en route to a fourth-placed finish in the championship. He would finish runner-up in the GT class the following season, scoring two wins and four podiums. That same season, Sofronas began competing in the American Le Mans Series, beginning with a one-off appearance at Laguna Seca with co-driver Bret Curtis, where the duo finished fifth in class. Sofronas and GMG Racing would continue to run a partial schedule in the series until 2012.

In 2017, Sofronas claimed a pair of titles in the Pirelli World Challenge, claiming the overall GTA title and the SprintX GT Pro/Am title. Partnering with Porsche factory drivers Laurens Vanthoor and Mathieu Jaminet, Sofronas took the SprintX title by just 13 points over Jan Heylen and Michael Schein. He scored 11 class victories in 19 starts between the two championships that season. He followed his championship haul in 2017 with two more in 2018, this time competing in GT4 machinery. Sofronas and co-driver Alex Welch claimed the SprintX GTS title, while Sofronas alone won the GTS class title overall.

In 2023, Sofronas began his 30th season of competition under the World Challenge/SRO America umbrella, fielding the first Audi R8 LMS Evo II on American soil.

GMG Racing

Sofronas and business partner Fabrice Kutyba founded Global Motorsports Group (GMG) in 2001, an aftermarket tuning service with a particular focus on European luxury marques. The two opened a shop in 2006, before upgrading to a 16,000 square-foot facility two years later. In August 2021, GMG opened temporary 8,000 square-foot shop at the Thermal Club, with plans to have a 23,000 square-foot facility completed at the site by summer 2023.

The company services Porsche, Ferrari, Audi, Mercedes-Benz, and BMW models, among others. Services include standard maintenance such as oil changes, as well as performance tuning. The group also operates a customer racing program in the SRO America umbrella of series, including the GT America Series, GT4 America Series, and GT World Challenge America. Their racing endeavors are closely intertwined with their tuning operations, with a series of World Challenge-based performance products being released in 2008. The team has won a number of titles in the Pirelli World Challenge, including a 2017 GTSA class victory for George Kurtz accompanying Sofronas' titles. In 2021, the team added a title in the inaugural season of the GT America Series with customer driver Jason Bell.

The team also works closely with Audi Sport, debuting and competing with the marque's racing cars. In 2012, GMG Racing became the first American providers of the new Audi R8 LMS GT3. In September 2019, Sofronas took part in the global debut of the Audi R8 LMS GT2 at the Circuit de Barcelona-Catalunya. At the SRO GT Anniversary, Sofronas fielded an Audi R8 LMS ultra, one of just two in the field. Ahead of the 2023 season, the team acquired an Audi R8 LMS Evo II, and were awaiting delivery of a Type-992 Porsche 911 GT3 R.

In 2021, the team expanded their relationship with Italian manufacturer Lamborghini, acquiring a Huracán GT3 Evo as part of a partnership with FFF Racing Team.

Racing record

Career summary

* Season still in progress.

Complete American Le Mans Series results
(key) (Races in bold indicate pole position)

Complete WeatherTech SportsCar Championship results
(key) (Races in bold indicate pole position)

* Season still in progress.

References

External links
James Sofronas at Motorsport.com

1968 births
Living people
American racing drivers
American Le Mans Series drivers
Rolex Sports Car Series drivers
WeatherTech SportsCar Championship drivers
24 Hours of Daytona drivers
GT World Challenge America drivers
W Racing Team drivers
Porsche Motorsports drivers
Michelin Pilot Challenge drivers